Adela Zaharia (born 1987) is a Romanian operatic soprano. She is currently a soloist at the Deutsche Oper am Rhein, Düsseldorf. In 2017, Zaharia won first place at the Operalia, The World Opera Competition.

Early life and education
Born in Arad, Romania, Zaharia studied piano from the age of six and later, music theory. She first sang with her church and high school choir. 

Silvia Demian the former director of the Sabin Drăgoi College of Art Zaharia studied claimed, the soprano's "lucky star" was meeting Mariana Nicolesco when Zaharia won the National Music Olympiad. 

Zaharia earned her bachelor's degree and master's degree, from Gheorghe Dima Music Academy studying voice and piano with Marius Budoiu.

Career
Zaharia made her debut in 2010 with the Romanian National Opera, Cluj-Napoca as Gilda in Rigoletto, followed by Norina in Don Pasquale, Musetta in La bohème, and Michaela in Carmen.

From 2012 to 2014 Zaharia was an ensemble member of the Komische Oper Berlin, where she performed as Musetta (La bohème), Pamina (The Magic Flute), Donna Anna (Don Giovanni), Helena (A Midsummer Night's Dream) and Micaëla (Carmen). Other roles include Donna Anna (Don Giovanni), Norina's (Don Pasquale) and Gilda's (Rigoletto) repertoire. Since the 2015/16 season, Zaharia has been a member of the Deutsche Oper am Rhein, where she performed as Snow Queen in The Snow Queen, Najade in Ariadne auf Naxos Lucia di Lammermoor, Konstanze (Mozart's The Abduction from the Seraglio), (Mozart's Don Giovanni) among others. In the 2017/18 season she will perform as Le Feu in L'enfant et les sortilèges, Gilda, Lucia and Konstanze. Guest engagements include Zaharia as Pamina at the Komische Oper Berlin; Gilda in Rigoletto and Violetta in La traviata at the Los Angeles Opera.

In December 2017 she gave her debut as Lucia at the Bavarian State Opera in Munich, Germany, substituting for Diana Damrau, who withdrew due to illness. As of 2018, she continues to collaborate with Komische Oper Berlin and has been debuting on stages such as Gran Teatre del Liceu Barcelona, Bolshoi Theatre Moscow, Edinburgh International Festival and Shanghai Grand Theatre.

Additional 2017/18 season include her debut as Elisabetta in Roberto Devereux at the Frankfurt's Opera and Play House, her debut at the George Enescu Festival with the mad scene from Iain Bell’s A Harlot's Progress and a three-week tour in Japan, where she will play Pamina in Die Zauberflote. Zaharia is also scheduled to perform with Plácido Domingo at a concert with the Jalisco Philharmonic Orchestra in Guadalajara.

Prizes
She was a winner of the Hariclea Darclée Festival and International Voice Competition in 2012. In 2017, she won first prize and the Zarzuela Prize of the Operalia, The World Opera Competition,  held that year in Astana, Kazakhstan. Euronews, in an article about Placido Domingo's Operalia 2017, praised Zaharia as being "the true revelation of the competition".

References

External links 
 Adela Zaharia, IMG Artists
 Zaharia in the list of Operalia 2017 winners

1987 births
Living people
People from Arad, Romania
Romanian operatic sopranos
21st-century Romanian women opera singers
Operalia, The World Opera Competition prize-winners